A. officinalis may refer to:
 Althaea officinalis, a mallow species
 Anchusa officinalis, the common bugloss or alkanet, a plant species
 Asparagus officinalis, a spring vegetable and a flowering perennial plant species native to most of Europe, northern Africa and western Asia
 Avicennia officinalis, a mangrove species

See also
 Officinalis